WBWN (104.1 FM, "B104") is a radio station licensed to the community of Le Roy, Illinois, and serving the greater Bloomington, Illinois, area. The station is owned by Cumulus Media. It airs a country music format.

The station was assigned the WBWN call letters by the Federal Communications Commission on December 21, 1992.

The station was the lone country music station in the Bloomington area until the 2007 flipping of WIBL to a country format.

Previous logos

References

External links
WBWN official website

BWN
Country radio stations in the United States
McLean County, Illinois
Cumulus Media radio stations